The Australian Contemporary Opera Company (ACOCo) is a not-for-profit contemporary opera company, based in Melbourne, Victoria, Australia. It was formerly known as "Gertrude Opera".

History
The company was established in 2008 primarily as a training repertory company for aspiring opera singers, and répétiteurs, directors and designers. It was first named "The Opera School Melbourne" and then "Gertrude Opera". Its creative staff include Linda Thompson (artistic director, 2008–present day, former Head of Classical Voice at Monash University), Brian Castles-Onion AM (board member and guest conductor). Creative teams have included Gale Edwards AM (artist in residence, 2019), costume designer Tim Chappel, Geraldine Turner AM, and Luke Leonard (Monk Parrots, USA). Conductors have included Brian Castles-Onion AM, Tianyi Lu, Patrick Burns, Benjamin Northey, and Dr David Kram. Staff members have included Andrea Katz (inaugural head of music, 2009–2011), and Cameron Menzies (head of stage direction 2010–2013).  In 2013 the Studio named its performing company "Gertrude Opera", after Gertrude Johnson incorporating the Studio stage performance program. In 2020 the company changed its name to the "Australian Contemporary Opera Company".

Productions
The company's repertoire spans Australian premieres, new works, and children's/family opera. "mini-festivals" and major productions. In later years, the company has become known for Australian premieres and staging of contemporary works and treatments. In 2015 the company founded Australia's only international opera festival (Nagambie 2015, 2016, Yarra Valley 2018, 2019)
International collaborators include Monk Parrots (USA) and Glyndebourne (Glyndebourne Opera Cup).

Selective list of productions
Australian premiere*
As One,* (Kiminsky/Campbell/Reed) 2020
The Enchanted Pig,* (Dove/Middleton) 2019
The Coronation of Poppea, (Monteverdi) 2019
Macbeth, (Verdi/Stopschinski) 2019 (Yarra Valley/New York)
The Handmaid's Tale,* (Ruders) 2018
Cosi fan tutte, (Mozart) 2018
The Elixir of Love, (Donizetti) 2018
To Hell and Back,* (Heggie) 2018, 2016
Alcina, (Handel) 2017
The Magic Flute, (Mozart) 2017
Doctor Miracle, (Bizet) 2017
The Consul, (Menotti) 2017
The Telephone, (Menotti) 2017
First Music, then Words, (Salieri) 2017
Thespis, (Gilbert & Sullivan) 2016
the difficulty of crossing a field,* (Lang) 2015
Tuesdays with Pictures,* (Williams) 2015
Bon Appétit!,* (Hoiby) 2015
Coffee Cantata, (Bach) (2015)
Trial by Jury, (Gilbert & Sullivan) (2015)
The Magic Flute, (Mozart) 2014
The Marriage of Figaro, (abr.) (Mozart) 2014
Cinderella, (Massenet) 2013
The Juniper Tree,* (Glass/Moran) 2011, 2013
Eugene Onegin, (Tchaikovsky) 2012
Orpheus in the Underworld, (Offenbach) 2011
Mini Opera Festival: Orpheus returns, 2011
Loves Luggage Lost, (Rossini) 2011
 Don Giovanni, (Mozart) 2010
The Magic Flute, (Mozart) (2009)
The Old Maid and the Thief, (Menotti) 2009
 Hansel and Gretel, (Humperdinck) 2009
Acis and Galatea, (Handel) 2009

Studio - Young Artists (2009 - 2019) 
Gertrude Opera runs an annual international Studio Young Artist program, building bridges to new audiences and a platform for professional growth.

Awards and honours
In 2018, and again in 2019, Gertrude Opera won OperaChaser's Outstanding Production by an Independent Company Award for the Australian premieres of The Handmaid's Tale (Ruders) and The Enchanted Pig (Dove).

In 2020, a Green Room Award for Programming - a world-first online contemporary opera festival.

In 2022, Honourable Mention at Tokyo Film Festival for love fail - a co-production with Monk Parrots USA

In 2022, Founder and Artistic director Linda Thompson was inducted into the Victorian Honour Roll of Women

See also
 National Theatre, Melbourne

References

External links
 Official website

Education in Melbourne
Australian opera companies
Performing arts in Melbourne
Musical groups established in 2008
2008 establishments in Australia